Gilberto Adame Soltero (born May 31, 1972, in Guadalajara, Jalisco), known as Gilberto Adame, is a Mexican football manager and former player.

External links
 
 

1972 births
Living people
Footballers from Guadalajara, Jalisco
Mexican football managers
Liga MX players
Mexican footballers
Association football defenders
21st-century Mexican people